Radek Lukeš (born January 5, 1979) is a Czech former professional ice hockey goaltender.

Lukeš began his career with HC České Budějovice and played two games for their senior side during the 1997–98 Czech Extraliga season. He then spent eight seasons in France, playing for Rapaces de Gap, Sangliers Arvernes de Clermont, Chamonix HC and Yétis du Mont-Blanc between 2001 and 2009.

References

External links

1979 births
Living people
Motor České Budějovice players
Chamonix HC players
Czech ice hockey goaltenders
IHC Písek players
Rapaces de Gap players
Hokej Šumperk 2003 players
HC Tábor players
Czech expatriate ice hockey people
Czech expatriate sportspeople in France
Expatriate ice hockey players in France